Flowers Hall, built in 1972, is a 4,000-seat multipurpose arena located in Florence, Alabama.  It is used primarily for basketball and volleyball, and is the home of the University of North Alabama Lions basketball and volleyball teams.

The first basketball game in the arena was a preseason NBA basketball game between the Boston Celtics and the Atlanta Hawks.  It has also hosted high school basketball games as well.

The main court at the arena has been replaced three times, most recently in 2004.  That same year new scorers' tables and scoreboards were installed, including a center-hung scoreboard that replaced the one installed in 1985.  Chairback seats were installed in 1989 on the home side and are sold only to season-ticket holders.

See also
 List of NCAA Division I basketball arenas

External links
Flowers Hall

Indoor arenas in Alabama
College basketball venues in the United States
Basketball venues in Alabama
North Alabama Lions sports venues
North Alabama Lions basketball
1972 establishments in Alabama
College volleyball venues in the United States
Sports venues completed in 1972